The 2016 Patriot League baseball tournament took place on consecutive weekends, with the semifinals held May 14–15 and the finals May 22–23 near the close of the 2016 NCAA Division I baseball season.  The higher seeded teams hosted each best of three series.   won the tournament for the sixth time and earned the conference's automatic bid to the 2016 NCAA Division I baseball tournament.

Seeding
The top four finishers from the regular season were seeded one through four, with the top seed hosting the fourth seed and second seed hosting the third.  The visiting team was designated as the home team in the second game of each series.

Results

References

Tournament
Patriot League Baseball Tournament
Pat